William Brassington (18 July 1881 – 7 June 1938) was a cricketer. He played in three first-class matches for British Guiana in 1901/02.

See also
 List of Guyanese representative cricketers

References

External links
 

1881 births
1938 deaths
Cricketers from British Guiana
Sportspeople from Georgetown, Guyana